StarDance ...když hvězdy tančí (English: StarDance ...when stars dance) is the Czech version of Dancing with the Stars. Eleven seasons were broadcast by Česká televize (1st in the autumn of 2006), hosted by Marek Eben and Tereza Kostková.

A ninth season was announced in summer of 2018, with 10 celebrities competing. StarDance is among the most viewed Czech TV programmes with 1.48 million viewers in average in 2018.

An eleventh season was announced in 2021, with these celebrities:

 Actor Jan Cina
 Pastor Martina Viktorie Kopecká
 Figure skater Tomáš Verner
 Singer Tereza Černochová
 Singer Mirai Navrátil
 Tenist Andrea Sestini Hlaváčková
 Actor Zdeněk Golda
 Actress Simona Babčáková
 Actress Marika Šoposká
 Actor Pavel Trávníček

Judging panel 
Key
 Judging panel
 Guest judge(s)

Professional dancers and their partners 

Key:
 Winner of the series
 Second place of the series
 Third place of the series
 First elimination of the series
 Withdrew in the series
 Elimination of the series (2nd to last)

Series overview

Highest-scoring celebrities
The scores presented below represent the best overall accumulative average scores the celebrity gained each season.

References

External links
 Official website

 
Czech reality television series
Czech Television original programming